Mona-Sophie Kohn (born 22 September 1995) is an Austrian football midfielder, currently playing for SV Neulengbach in the ÖFB-Frauenliga. 
She is an Under-17 international.

Titles
 1 Austrian League (2011)
 1 Austrian Cup (2011)

References

1995 births
Living people
Austrian women's footballers
SV Neulengbach (women) players
Women's association football midfielders
ÖFB-Frauenliga players